The Nonette is a tributary to the river Oise in northern France. Its source is in Nanteuil-le-Haudouin, from which it flows west through Senlis and Chantilly, and joins the Oise near Saint-Leu-d'Esserent.

The river has relatively high turbidity and its brownish water has a modest 
velocity due to the slight gradient of the watercourse; pH levels have been measured at 9.25 or quite alkaline near the Château d'Ermenonville and electrical conductivity of the waters have tested at 81 micro-siemens per centimetre.

References

Rivers of France
Rivers of Hauts-de-France
Rivers of Oise